Graeme is an English-language surname. It is a habitational name, derived from Grantham in Lincolnshire, England.

People
This list only contains people with the surname 'Graeme'.  For a list of people with the given names 'Graham' or 'Graeme' see .
 Alexander Graeme (1741–1818), Scottish naval officer
 David Graeme (1716–1797) Scottish soldier, diplomat and courtier, MP for Perthshire 1764–73
 David Graeme (died 1726)  MP for Perthshire 1724–26
 Elizabeth Graeme Ferguson (1737–1801), American poet
 James Graeme, British actor and singer
 James Graeme (poet), (1749–1772), Scottish poet
 Peter Graeme (1921–2012), English oboist
 Richard Graeme (fl. 1600), English soldier

References

See also
 Graham
 Grahame

English-language surnames
English toponymic surnames